David Shillinglaw (born 1982) is a British artist.

Early life and family 

David Shillinglaw, is a London-based artist born to British parents in Saudi Arabia. He trained at Central Saint Martins, London and graduated in 2002.

Notable works 
David's folk-inspired work depicts human faces and the thoughts that rush around in our brains and can be found in his murals and his various books such as "The Dance of 1000 Faces".

References

Living people
Street artists
1982 births